ARB Günəş is an Azerbaijani TV channel for children. All of the channel's content is voice-overed into Azerbaijani, except for those that are Azerbaijani originals and those that include no talking.

History

ARB Günəş was launched on 10 April 2015. By the command of the National Television and Radio Council of the Republic of Azerbaijan in 2011, ARB Günəş is licensed to broadcast for 6 years.

The channel was previously known as Günəş TV (or Gunash TV). On 19 September 2016, Günəş TV rebranded into ARB Günəş, a fusion with ARB Media Qrup, with a new logo but some of the same programming. Their old slogan was "" (Turn on the sun), but was changed to "" (The country's first children's channel). The channel also went from 4:3 to 16:9. 
On 4 March 2019, the channel shut down until 9 March 2019 for unknown reasons, while showing a few commercials. They said that they "went to sleep."

Programming

Current programming

 Adventures of the Gummi Bears
 Around the World with Willy Fog
 Avatar: The Last Airbender (Avatar)
 Bernard (Bernard)
 Chip 'n Dale: Rescue Rangers
 Gazoon
 Kid-E-Cats
 Kikoriki
 Kung Fu Panda: Legends of Awesomeness
 Maya the Honey Bee
 Masha and The Bear
 My Little Pony: Friendship Is Magic
 Mia and Me
 Musti
 Oscar's Oasis
 The Penguins of Madagascar
 Pokémon: Indigo League (Pokémon)
 Scooby-Doo! Mystery Incorporated
 The Smurfs
 SpongeBob SquarePants
 Strawberry Shortcake's Berry Bitty Adventures
 TaleSpin
 Ed, Edd n Eddy
 Tom and Jerry
 Winnie Pooh
 Winx Club
 Willy Fog 2
 The World of David the Gnome
 Jimmy Two-Shoes
 ChalkZone

Movies

 A Goofy Movie
 Aladdin and the King of Thieves
 Alpha and Omega
 Alpha and Omega 2
 Atlantis: The Lost Empire
 Atlantis: Milo's Return
 Around the World in 80 Days Willy Fog
 Back to the Sea
 Bambi 2
 Barbie as Rapunzel
 Barbie in A Mermaid Tale
 Barbie in the 12 Dancing Princesses
 Barbie in the Pink Shoes
 Barbie: Princess Charm School
 Beauty and the Beast
 Bee Movie
 Brother Bear
 Brother Bear 2
 A Bug's Life (Həşəratların həyatı: Flikin macəraları)
 The Care Bears' Big Wish Movie
 Cars
 Cars 2
 Cloudy with a Chance of Meatballs
 Cinderella
 Cinderella II: Dreams Come True
 Dragon Hunters (film)
 Dr. Seuss’ Horton Hears a Who!
 DuckTales the Movie: Treasure of the Lost Lamp (Ördəklərin əhvalatı: İtirilmiş çırağın sirri)
 Epic
 Everyone's Hero (Hər kəsin qəhrəmanı)
 Gold Antelope
 The Great Mouse Detective
 How to Train Your Dragon
 How to Train Your Dragon 2
 The Hunchback of Notre Dame II
 The Incredibles
 The Iron Giant
 Khumba (Kumba)
 Kung Fu Panda
 Kung Fu Panda 2
 Lady and the Tramp (Ledi və Avara)
 Lady and the Tramp II: Scamp's Adventure (Ledi və Avara 2: Dəcəlin macəraları)
 Lilo and Stitch 2
 The Lion King (Kral şir 1)
 The Lion King 2 (Kral şir 2)
 The Lion King 3 (Kral şir 3)
 The Lorax
 The Little Mermaid II: Return to the Sea
 The Little Mermaid: Ariel's Beginning
 Madagascar (Madaqaskar 1)
 Madagascar 2 (Madaqaskar 2)
 Madagascar 3: Europe's Most Wanted
 The Many Adventures of Winnie the Pooh
 Mulan
 Lion of Oz
 Oliver & Company
 Open Season
 Open Season 2
 Open Season 3
 Pocahontas
 The Princess and the Goblin
 Rise of the Guardians
 Scooby-Doo! and the Samurai Sword
 Scooby-Doo! Legend of the Phantosaur
 Scooby-Doo! Mask of the Blue Falcon
 Secret of the Wings
 Snow White and the Seven Dwarfs
 Surf's Up
 The Swan Princess: The Mystery of the Enchanted Kingdom
 Tangled
 Tarzan & Jane
 The Three Musketeers 
 Tinker Bell
 Tinker Bell and the Lost Treasure
 Tom and Jerry: Robin Hood and His Merry Mouse
 Tom and Jerry: Shiver Me Whiskers
 Toy Story
 Treasure Planet
 The Ugly Duckling and Me!
 WALL-E
 Up
 Wallace and Gromit

Films
 Dede Qorqud
 My Seven Sons
 Tarzan

See also
 Television in Azerbaijan

References

External links
Official website
Facebook
YouTube

Television networks in Azerbaijan
2015 establishments in Azerbaijan
Television channels and stations established in 2015